"Shout It Out" is a song by British-Australian recording artist Reece Mastin, taken from his second studio album, Beautiful Nightmare (2012). It was released digitally on 29 June 2012, as the second single from the album. The song was written by Mastin and production duo DNA, who also produced it. "Shout It Out" peaked at number one in Australia and number eight in New Zealand. It was certified platinum by the Australian Recording Industry Association (ARIA), denoting sales of 70,000 copies. The accompanying music video features a cameo appearance by Home and Away actress Rhiannon Fish, who plays Mastin's love interest.

Background and reception 
"Shout It Out" was written by Reece Mastin with Anthony Egizii and David Musumeci of the production duo DNA, who also produced the song. It was released digitally on 29 June 2012, and physically on 3 August 2012. In Australia, the song debuted on the ARIA Singles Chart at number one on 9 July 2012, with first-week sales of 23,400 copies. It became Mastin's second number-one single on that chart, following his debut single "Good Night" (2011).

"Shout It Out" became the 97th song to debut atop the ARIA Singles Chart, and the 427th number-one single in the chart's history. The song was certified platinum by the Australian Recording Industry Association (ARIA), denoting sales of 70,000 copies. Mastin became the first Australian artist to achieve two number one singles during the 2010s decade. That same week, "Shout It Out" debuted and peaked at number eight on the New Zealand Singles Chart.

Music video
The accompanying music video for "Shout It Out" premiered on Vevo on 1 July 2012. It features a cameo appearance by Home and Away actress Rhiannon Fish, who plays Mastin's love interest. The video sees the pair playing a couple on a road trip through the Atherton Tableland, going camping, swimming under a waterfall, and ending at a lookout view of Sydney. A writer for The Hot Hits called it "The hottest video of the year".

Track listing
CD single / digital download
"Shout It Out" – 3:30

Credits and personnel
Credits adapted from the liner notes of Beautiful Nightmare.

Locations
Recorded and mastered at Studios 301 in Sydney.

Personnel
Songwriting – Reece Mastin, Anthony Egizii, David Musumeci
Production – DNA
Mixing – Anthony Egizii
Programming and keys – Anthony Egizii
Guitars and bass – David Musumeci
Mastering – Leon Zervos

Charts

Weekly charts

Year-end chart

Certifications

Release history

See also
List of number-one singles of 2012 (Australia)

References

2012 songs
2012 singles
Reece Mastin songs
Number-one singles in Australia
Sony Music Australia singles
Songs written by David Musumeci
Songs written by Anthony Egizii
Song recordings produced by DNA Songs